Sir George Francis Hampson, 10th Baronet (14 January 1860 – 15 October 1936) was an English entomologist.

Hampson studied at Charterhouse School and Exeter College, Oxford. He travelled to India to become a tea-planter in the Nilgiri Hills of the Madras presidency (now Tamil Nadu), where he became interested in moths and butterflies. When he returned to England he became a voluntary worker at the Natural History Museum, where he wrote The Lepidoptera of the Nilgiri District (1891) and The Lepidoptera Heterocera of Ceylon (1893) as parts 8 and 9 of Illustrations of Typical Specimens of Lepidoptera Heterocera of the British Museum. He then commenced work on  The Fauna of British India, Including Ceylon and Burma: Moths (four volumes, 1892–1896).

Albert C. L. G. Günther offered him a position as an assistant at the museum in March 1895, and, after succeeding to his baronetcy in 1896, he was promoted to the acting assistant keeper in 1901. He then worked on a Catalogue of the Lepidoptera Phalaenae in the British Museum (15 volumes, 1898–1920).

He married Minnie Frances Clark-Kennedy on 1 June 1893 and had three children.

References

The Natural History Museum at South Kensington William T. Stearn

External links
 

English taxonomists
1860 births
1936 deaths
English lepidopterists
Employees of the Natural History Museum, London
Naturalists of British India
Baronets in the Baronetage of England
Alumni of Exeter College, Oxford
People educated at Charterhouse School
British people in colonial India
19th-century British zoologists
20th-century British zoologists